Scopula oenoloma is a moth of the  family Geometridae. It is found in Malawi.

References

Endemic fauna of Malawi
Moths described in 1932
Taxa named by Louis Beethoven Prout
oenoloma
Lepidoptera of Malawi
Moths of Sub-Saharan Africa